Leka Beach is a beach and bird sanctuary in Parit Jawa, Muar District, Johor, Malaysia; it has an area of approximately twenty hectares and provides food and shelter for migratory birds. The conservation of the local mangrove forests in these areas is paramount in protecting these rare species - this is done by controlling the cutting of mangrove trees, to protect the birds' habitat.

Five types of migratory birds have been seen recently for the first time in 30 years:
The Asian dowitcher (Limnodromus semipalmatu)
The Chinese egret (Egretta eulophotes)
The grey-tailed tattler (Heteroscelus brevipes)
The great knot (Calidris tenuirostris)
The bar-tailed godwit (Limosa lapponica)

External links
 Habitat News

Beaches of Malaysia
Bird sanctuaries
Muar District
Wildlife sanctuaries of Malaysia